The 1969 Pittsburgh Panthers football team represented the University of Pittsburgh in the 1969 NCAA University Division football season.  The team compiled a 4–6 record in its first year under head coach Carl DePasqua. The team's statistical leaders included Jim Friedl with 1,277 passing yards and Tony Esposito with 743 rushing yards.

Schedule

Roster

References

Pittsburgh
Pittsburgh Panthers football seasons
Pittsburgh Panthers football